"Now or Never" is a jazz song written by singer Billie Holiday, and composer Curtis Reginald Lewis.

Recording session
Studio Session No. 63, New York City, September 30, 1949, Sy Oliver and His Orchestra (Decca), with Bernie Privin (trumpet), Sid Cooper, Johnny Mince (alto saxophone), Artie Drellinger, Pat Nizza (tenor saxophone), Billy Kyle (piano), Everett Barksdale (guitar), Joe Benjamin (bass), Jimmy Crawford (drums), and Billie Holiday (vocal).

Notable cover versions
 Nnenna Freelon (2005)

References

External links
 The Unofficial Billie Holiday Website

1949 songs
Billie Holiday songs
Songs written by Billie Holiday